8 Teeth to Eat You is a split EP between Cursive and the Japanese punk band Eastern Youth. It was released on June 4, 2002. Cursive's half of the EP was subsequently re-released as part of the remastered deluxe edition of The Ugly Organ.

Track listing

Personnel

Cursive
Tim Kasher – guitar, vocals
Gretta Cohn – cello
Matt Maginn – bass guitar
Clint Schnase – drums
Ted Stevens – guitar, vocals
Mike Mogis – recording, mixing, production
Doug Van Sloun – mastering

Eastern Youth
Hisashi Yoshino – guitar, vocals
Tomokazu Ninomiya – bass guitar
Atsuya Tamori – drums
Eddie Ashworth – recording, mixing, production
Shinji Yoshikoshi – assistant engineering
Eddy Schreyer – mastering

References

External links
Better Looking Records Webpage
Five One Inc. Webpage

Cursive (band) EPs
2002 EPs
Split EPs
Saddle Creek Records EPs